Kentucky Route 1681 (KY 1681) is a  state highway in Kentucky that runs from Kentucky Route 1659 immediately north of Millville to U.S. Route 60, Kentucky Route 922, and Manchester Street on the northwestern side of downtown Lexington.

Route description 
The highway originates in northwestern Woodford County at a junction with KY 1659 at Millville. It then goes through parts of southeastern Franklin County, where it runs concurrently with U.S. Route 60 (US 60) for  before KY 1681 returns to Woodford County, under the alternate name Old Frankfort Pike. This stretch of road was part of the original thoroughfare between Frankfort and Lexington. The route passes the site of Woodburn Stud, the birthplace of Kentucky's thoroughbred industry. The farm is now operated under the name Airdrie Stud.

The highway runs through mainly rural areas of Woodford County, including the point where it intersects US 62. It enters Fayette County (Metro Lexington), and then intersects New Circle Road upon entry into the city. It ends at a junction with US 60, KY 922, and Manchester Street in northwestern downtown Lexington.

History

KY 1861 formerly traveled along Manchester Street past its current terminus at US 60 and KY 922 to a junction with KY 1928 (Jefferson Street) in downtown Lexington near the Mary Todd Lincoln Home and Rupp Arena.

Major intersections

References

1681
Transportation in Lexington, Kentucky
Transportation in Franklin County, Kentucky
Transportation in Woodford County, Kentucky